The Norristown Cemetery is a historic cemetery off Lock and Dam Road, on the south side of Russellville, Arkansas.  It is a small community cemetery, with thirty marked grave sites, the oldest of which is dated 1853 and the newest 1934.  It is the only surviving remnant of the community of Norristown, which was an early settlement and the first county seat of Pope County.

The cemetery was listed on the National Register of Historic Places in 1995.

See also
 National Register of Historic Places listings in Pope County, Arkansas

References

External links
 

Cemeteries on the National Register of Historic Places in Arkansas
National Register of Historic Places in Pope County, Arkansas
Buildings and structures completed in 1853
Buildings and structures in Russellville, Arkansas
1853 establishments in Arkansas
Cemeteries established in the 1850s